Ira Neuper (15 August 1922 – 11 November 1994) was a South African cricketer. He played in three first-class matches for Border in 1950/51.

See also
 List of Border representative cricketers

References

External links
 

1922 births
1994 deaths
South African cricketers
Border cricketers
Cricketers from East London, Eastern Cape